Cymbachina is a monotypic genus of South Pacific crab spiders containing the single species, Cymbachina albobrunnea, found on the Polynesian Islands. The species was first described in 1893 by A. T. Urquhart under the name Xysticus albo-brunnea. As classification became more focused on physical structure rather than color patterns or teeth on tarsal claws, this species was re-examined in 1933 and placed into its own genus.

See also
 List of Thomisidae species

References

Monotypic Araneomorphae genera
Spiders of New Zealand
Thomisidae